The slender seahorse or longsnout seahorse (Hippocampus reidi) is a species of fish in the family Syngnathidae that usually inhabits subtropical regions.

Description
The slender seahorses have a gestation period of around two weeks and typically grow to be approximately 6.8 inches long (17.5 centimeters), while the mean height of juvenile slender seahorses is only around 8.2 millimeters. Males are usually orange, while the females are yellow. However, both males and females may have brown or white spots placed sporadically upon their body. These spots may also change into a pink or white color during the courtship period.

Habitat and distribution

Smaller individuals inhabit shallower waters. The slender seahorse has an affinity for coral reefs and seagrass beds and can be found on gorgonian coral, seagrass, mangroves, and Sargassum. It is native to many countries, including the Bahamas, Barbados, Belize, Bermuda, Brazil, Colombia, Cuba, Grenada, Haiti, Jamaica, Panama, United States (Florida and North Carolina), and Venezuela. It inhabits subtropical regions, ranging from 29 degrees north to 25 degrees south and 133 degrees west to 40 degrees east. Many H. reidi reside near China and more so in Brazil but in both areas they are at a risk of becoming an endangered species. In China these seahorses are used for trade and for traditionally Chinese medication, while in Brazil they are part of a large trading, involving the commercial extraction of 25 million seahorses per year.

Naming
The specific name honors Earl D. Reid of the Division of Fishes at the Smithsonian Institution.

References

External links
 

slender seahorse
Fauna of the Southeastern United States
Fish of the Western Atlantic
slender seahorse
slender seahorse
Taxonomy articles created by Polbot